Çavdarlı may refer to:

 Çavdarlı, Aziziye
 Çavdarlı, Hanak, village in Ardahan Province, Turkey
 Çavdarlı, Şavşat, village in Artvin Province, Turkey
 Çavdarlı, Tarsus, village in Mersin Province, Turkey

People with the surname
 Cemal Çavdarlı, Turkish-Belgian politician

Turkish-language surnames